Deplorable Pride is a conservative LGBT organization in Albemarle, North Carolina, in the Charlotte metropolitan area that supports  
Donald Trump and his administration. It has been described as "alt-right." Deplorable Pride was created on June 6, 2017, as a group of LGBT Trump supporters who wanted a float in the Charlotte Pride Parade, which it was denied. Charlotte Pride said they denied the group's participation because of Deplorable Pride's anti-LGBT and other views which did not comport with its mission. GLAAD also criticized Deplorable Pride's views, calling it a "fringe alt-right" group and highlighting several hostile statements from the organization, including comments by Deplorable Pride leader Brian Talbert that he would kill “every single” Muslim and several other statements using slurs and profanities to refer to LGBT people and Muslims. On July 26, 2017, Deplorable Pride came out in support of President Trump's tweets announcing he would be banning transgender individuals from military service in the United States Army. On May 12, 2018, Talbert was arrested and charged with assault on a woman during an altercation with counter-protesters.

See also
 Alt-lite
 DeploraBall
 Gays for Trump
 LGBT conservatism in the United States

References

External links
 

2017 establishments in the United States
Alt-right organizations
LGBT conservatism in the United States
LGBT political advocacy groups in North Carolina
Political organizations established in 2017
Presidency of Donald Trump